The following is a list of things named after Hungarian physicist E. P. Wigner.

Physics 
Bloch–Wigner function
Breit–Wigner distribution (disambiguation)
Relativistic Breit–Wigner distribution 
Bargmann–Wigner equations
Jordan–Wigner transformation
Newton–Wigner localization 
Polynomial Wigner–Ville distribution
Thomas–Wigner rotation 
Von Neumann–Wigner interpretation
Von Neumann–Wigner theorem
Wigner 3-j symbols
Wigner's 6-j symbols
Wigner's 9-j symbols
Wigner–Araki–Yanase theorem
Wigner–Yanase–Dyson conjecture
Wigner–Eckart theorem
Wigner–Inonu contraction  
Wigner–Seitz cell  
Wigner–Seitz radius
Wigner–Weyl transform  
Wigner–Wilkins spectrum   
Wigner's classification

Wigner's friend 
Wigner's theorem
Wigner crystal
Wigner D-matrix
Wigner effect  
Wigner energy  
 Wigner lattice
 Wigner poisoning, Xe-135 "poisoning" in nuclear reactors poisoning.
 Wigner rotation
 Wigner-Witmer correlation rules

Mathematics
Gabor–Wigner transform
 
Wigner distribution function
Wigner semicircle distribution
Wigner surmise

Other
Wigner fusion
Wigner Research Centre for Physics in Budapest, which houses the Wigner Data Center.
 Eugene P. Wigner Reactor Physicist Award at the American Nuclear Society.
 Wigner Fellowship Program at Oak Ridge National Laboratory (ORNL).
Eugene-Wigner-Colloquium at the Institut für Theoretische Physik of Technische Universität Berlin.
Eugene-Paul-Wigner-Building at Technische Universität Berlin.
The Eugene P. Wigner Auditorium  at Oak Ridge National Laboratory

References

w